Philip Hayden Redding (January 25, 1890 – March 30, 1929) was a Major League Baseball pitcher who made three starts in 1912 and one relief appearance in 1913 for the St. Louis Cardinals.

Redding continued to pitch in the minor leagues, with trials as high as A ball, but mostly in classes C and D, winning 23 games in his final season of 1916.

External links

1890s births
1928 deaths
St. Louis Cardinals players
Major League Baseball pitchers
Baseball players from Mississippi
Hattiesburg Woodpeckers players
Hattiesburg Timberjacks players
Columbus Joy Riders players
Nashville Vols players
Columbus Foxes players
Atlanta Crackers players
Columbia Comers players
Charlotte Hornets (baseball) players